Sohan Lal Jain (born 15 December 1929 in Dehradun) is an Indian paleontologist, who worked for 33 years at the Indian Statistical Institute, Kolkata.  The large herbivorous sauropod dinosaur genus Jainosaurus, was named in his honour after it was identified as a distinct genus although initially thought to be a species of Antarctosaurus. His other major contributions to paleontology were in the study of sauropod braincases and some fossil turtles.

References

Indian paleontologists
Living people
20th-century Indian zoologists
Scientists from Kolkata
20th-century Indian earth scientists
1929 births